Alma is a commune located in Sibiu County, Transylvania, Romania. It is composed of three villages: Alma, Giacăș (Gyákos; Jakobsdorf) and Șmig (Somogyom; Schmiegen). At the 2011 census, 70.1% of inhabitants were Romanians, 24.2% Hungarians and 4.7% Roma.

References

Communes in Sibiu County
Localities in Transylvania